The Brigadér Halling House is a listed property at Lille Strandstræde 14 in central Copenhagen, Denmark. It takes its name after William Halling, a Dane who acquired the building shortly after returning to Denmark from India where he had served in the British army. He was known as Brigadér Halling (Brigadér von Halling) after he acquired the title Brigadér in 1872. The building now houses the Maltese embassy.

History

18th century

The property was part of a much larger property in the late 17th century. It was listed as No. 28 in St. Ann's East Quarter by 1689 and owned by Admiral Marcus Rodsten,

The property now known as Lille Strandstræde 14 was owned by Hans Seidelin from 1715. The current building was constructed in the 1730s. On Seidelin's death in 1752, the property was passed to his nephew Hans Diderik Brinck-Seidelin.

After just two years, Brinch-Seidelin sold the property to vice admiral Hans Henrik Rømeling (1707–1775). In the new cadastre of 1756, the property was listed as No. 100.

The property was acquired in 1772 by William von Halling, who had just returned from India where he had been in British military service. He altered and expanded the building from 1773 to 1776. It is believed that the architect was Hans Næss, a student of Nicolas-Henri Jardin. In 1774, he married Christine Linde Hvas de Lindenpalm, the only daughter of Jørgen Hvas de Lindenpalm. He received the two estates Tirsbæk and Bryckesborg as dowry, renaming the latter Willamsborg. In 1776, he ceded Tirsbæk to count Caspar von Moltke in exchange for Dronninglund in Vendsyssel. Here later constructed a large town mansion in Aalborg (now Hotel Phønic).

The brewery, 17771924
On 17 June 1888, the property was acquired by brewer Jacob Christensen Koutrup. Koutrup had been the owner of a large brewery on Kongens Nytorv, but on 4 May 1776, just after midnight, it was destroyed by fire. A brewery worker was later sentenced to three years of forced labour for negligence.

73-year-old Koutrup established a new brewery in the yard of his new property. After his death less than one year later, the brewery was continued by his wife Johanne Koutrup.

At the time of the 1787 census, No. 100 was home to two households. Johanna Kantrup resided in the building with her daughter Inger Sophia Elisbeth, a maid, a female cook, three brewery workers and a coachman. Johannes Hendrick Mincke, a 33-year-old student, resided in another dwelling with his wife Ulrica Georgina, their one-year-old son Carl, a male servant, a caretaker, a maid, a wet nurse and a female cook.

In 1794, Jens Johansen Noor purchased the property.

At the time of the 1801 census, Noor resided in the building with his wife Sophie Magdalene Noor, their three children (aged one to ten), a maid, a wet nurse, a caretaker and two brewery workers. The brewery was managed by Erland Wolkwardtsen. Just Peter Meinertz, a broker, resided in the other apartment with his wife Maren Hansen, their three-year-old son Frederik Meinertz, a 17-year-old office clerk and a maid. Hans Nielsen Kellerman (1739–1807), a ship broker, resided in the building with his wife Margrethe née Teilman (1739-1801), two unmarried women (aged 18 and 59), a male servant, a maid and a female cook.

In the new cadastre of 1806, the property was listed as No. 68. It was still owned by Noor. The property was later the same year sold to Andreas Petersen. He was a merchant but continued the brewery.

Dr. Ryge's House, 18241850

The property was acquired by the Royal Danish Theatre in 1824. In 1832, the property in Lille Strandstræde became known as No. 68 A. This happened after a section of it had been merged with a section of No. 66 to form No. 66 B & 68 B (from 1879 part of Nyhavn 31).

At the time of the 1834 census, No. 68 A was home to three households. Johann Christian Ryge, an actor at the Royal Danish Theatre, resided on the ground floor with his wife Charlotte Betzy née Anthon, their four children (aged one to seven), two children from Ryge's first marriage (aged 18 and 21) and two maids. Wilhelm Nielsen, a royal stableman, resided in another dwelling on the ground floor with his wife Catharine Marie née Ziegler. Hans Nicolai Soelberg, a coachman, resided in a third dwelling on the ground floor together with two servants. Jens Jacob Ellebye, a royal workman, resided in the basement with his wife Birthe Kirstine (née Rasmussen) and their 11-year-old daughter.

At the time of the 1840 census, No. 68 was home to a total of 30 residents. Ryge and his wife were still residing on the ground floor with their now eight children (aged three to 21) and two maids. Hans Nicolai Sodberg, the coachman, now married and with two children, was also still residing on the ground floor. Niels Nielsen Lund, the proprietor of a tavern in the basement, resided in the associated dwelling with his wife Anne Jensen, their six children (aged five to 13) and four lodgers. Gotthilf Ferdinand Lassen (1903–1860), a former inspector at the Royal Danish Theatre and a historical collector, resided with a maid on the first floor.

Charlotte Betry Ryge had become a widow by 1850. She was still residing in the ground floor apartment with five daughters (aged 13 to 23) and two maids. Niels Jørgen Jensen, an ironmonger, was now residing in the basement with his wife Maren Kirstine Kondrup, their one-year-old son and a lodger.

Hans Nicolai Soelberg, 185087

Hans Nicolai Soelberg, who had started a haulier's business by then, was able to buy the entire building in 1850.

The property was home to 35 residents at the 1880 census.

Hans Nicolai Soelberg, who had now retired, resided on the ground floor with his wife Vilhelmine Soelberg (née Nielsen)	and their son Frits Holger Billenstein. Jac Cohn, a businessman, resided on the ground floor with his wife Line Cohn, their four sons (aged 19 to 26) and two maids. Niels Christian Aars, a manufacturer of cigars, resided on the first floor with his wife Adelgunde Aars (née Soelberg), one maid and one lodger. Søren Peter Jacobsen, a restaurateur (gæstgiver), resided in the basement with his wife Anna Eleonora Christine Frederikke Jacobsen. Niels Jørgen Jensen, an ironmonger, resided in the basement with his wife Maren Christine Jensen and two daughters (aged 21 and 23). Louise Mathilde Holm født Büch, a widow, resided on the second floor of the rear wing with her aughter Laura Aurora Holm, a 10-year-old grandson, one maid and one lodger. Johan Axel Christoffer Hermansen, a workman, resided on the second floor of the rear wing. Jens Peter Holm, a master tailor, resided on the second floor of the rear wing.

Later history
In 1887, H. C. Nyholm purchased the property. Just one year later he sold it to farmer F. Külerich. In 1890, it changed hands again when it was acquired by A. T. Linek.

In 1898, the property was acquired by J. A. Schiönberg & Co. and R. E. Hartvig. In 1902, J. A. Schiönberg & Co. became the sole owner of the property.

In 1908, Frank W. Nissler. He was the owner of C. Bogn & Co., a haullier's business at Købmagergade 26 with roots back to 779.

Architecture

The four-bay median risalit and decorations on the facade date from the expansion of the building in 1773–1776. The gate was not moved when the house was expanded and is therefore not placed in the centre of the building. This has been solved by placing the gate and an undecorated window in a slightly recessed portion of the median risalit.

Today
The building now houses the Maltese embassy.

Li of owners

 1658–1661: Jocum Dorn's widow Ellen
 1670–1687: Admiral Marquarc Rodsteen
  1687–1688:  Holger Rosenkrantz
 1688:  Peder Christensen
  Jens Broch
 1695: Flemming Holck 
1695–1703: Oberst Christian Rodsteen
 1703: Dowager Queen Charlotte Amalie
 1715: Prince Carl
 1715-1752:  Hans Seidelin
 1752-1754: Hans Diderich Brinch-Seidelin
 1754: Vice Admiral Hans Henrik Rømeling
 1775: Agent Eckert
1777: Brewer Jacob Christensen Koutrup
 1778–1787: Johanne Koutrup
 1794–1796: Brewer, commander-in-chief Jens Johansen Noor
 1806–1824: Brewer, grocer Andreas Petersen
 1824–1850: Royal Danish Theatre – Dr. Ryge
 1850–1887: Cartman Hans Nicolai Soelberg
 1887–1888: Director H. C. Nyholm
 1888–1890: Proprietor F. Külerich
 1890–1898: A. T. Linek
 1898–1908: J. A. Schiönberg and R. E. Hartvig Corporation
 1902–1909:  J. A. Schiönberg & Co.
 1908–1916: Cartman Frank W. Nissler
 1916–1926: B. Muus & Co. and Andersen & Muus
 1926–1930: Københavns Nye Ejendomsselskab A/S
 1930– 1948: ?
 1948–1978: Civil engineer M. P. Pedersen
 1948–1965: Grocer Aage Christensen
 1965–1979: Ms. Ketty Christensen
 1978–1992: Ib & Jørgen Rasmussen, architects
 1979–2019: Ms. Helle Christensen and director Henning Lippert
 1992–2007: T.K. Development A/S
 2007: Subdivided into five condominiums
 2019– : HL Udlejning ApS.

References

External links

 Source
 Source

Listed residential buildings in Copenhagen
Residential buildings completed in 1776